Nkosinathi Ogle (born 17 March 1990) is a South African professional footballer, who currently plays for Premier Soccer League club Moroka Swallows as a midfielder and striker.

References 

1988 births
Living people
Association football forwards
Association football midfielders
Moroka Swallows F.C. players
People from Ugu District Municipality
South African soccer players
Thanda Royal Zulu F.C. players
Lamontville Golden Arrows F.C. players
Mpumalanga Black Aces F.C. players
University of Pretoria F.C. players